Lieutenant General Man Mohan Singh Rai, PVSM, AVSM, VSM was the Vice Chief of Army Staff (VCOAS) of the Indian Army and assumed office on 1 August 2015 following the retirement of Lieutenant General Philip Campose. He retired on 31 July 2016 and was succeeded by General Bipin Rawat.

Early life and education 
Rai is an alumnus of National Defence Academy, Pune and passed out third in order of merit. He has attended Defence Services Staff College, Wellington and Army War College, Mhow.

Career 
Rai was commissioned into Bombay Sappers on 15 December 1976. He is a third generation officer in the army and has vast operational and command experience. He has commanded an armored engineer Regiment; a mountain brigade in the North East India; a Counter Insurgency Force in Jammu and Kashmir; XII Corps (Jodhpur); Chief of Staff South Western Command and GOC-in-C Eastern Command. He has also held various staff appointments including Directing Staff at Defence Service Staff College; Colonel General Staff Operations of a high altitude Corps; Chief Engineer of a Desert Corps; Brigadier General Staff at Army Training Command and Deputy Director General at Military Operations Directorate (Army HQ). He was also the Colonel Commandant of the Bombay Sappers.

During his career, he has been awarded the Param Vishisht Seva Medal (January 2016) as Lieutenant General, Ati Vishisht Seva Medal (January 2011) as Major General  of Rashtriya Rifles in Jammu and Kashmir and Vishisht Seva Medal as Brigadier.

Honours and decorations

References 

Living people
Indian Army officers
Indian generals
Recipients of the Ati Vishisht Seva Medal
Recipients of the Param Vishisht Seva Medal
Vice Chiefs of Army Staff (India)
Recipients of the Vishisht Seva Medal
National Defence Academy (India) alumni
Year of birth missing (living people)
Army War College, Mhow alumni
Defence Services Staff College alumni